Buck Satan and the 666 Shooters is an American alternative country band, formed by Ministry frontman Al Jourgensen, who uses the pseudonym Buck Satan. The initial lineup also featured Rick Nielsen of Cheap Trick and ex-Ministry members Tony Campos and Mike Scaccia.

The band was formed in 2006 after the death of the country singer Buck Owens, who inspired Jourgensen to start the project. Jourgensen also referred to band's musical style as "heavy western" and "country-core".

The band's only studio album, Bikers Welcome Ladies Drink Free, was released on January 17, 2012, via 13th Planet. It received mixed reviews from critics.

The band's guitarist, Mike Scaccia, died on December 23, 2012, due to a heart attack while performing onstage with Rigor Mortis.

Members
Current members
 Tony Campos – bass (2006–present)
 Rick Nielsen – guitar (2006–present)
 Buck Satan – vocals, banjo, guitar, pedal steel guitar, harmonica, keyboards, mandolin (2006–present)

Past members
 Mike Scaccia – guitar, banjo, dobro (2006–2012)

Discography
Studio album
 Bikers Welcome Ladies Drink Free (2012, 13th Planet)

References

External links
 

Musical groups established in 2006
American alternative country groups
Cowpunk musical groups
Ministry (band)